Forrest Galante (born March 31, 1988) is a Zimbabwean-American  outdoor adventurer, television personality, and conservationist. He works in the field of wildlife biology, specializing in the exploration of animals on the brink of extinction. He is the host of the television shows Extinct or Alive on Animal Planet and "Mysterious Creatures with Forrest Galante," as well as multiple Shark Week shows.

Early life 
Shortly after his birth in California, Galante and his family moved to Harare, Zimbabwe, where his mother ran a safari business. He and his sister, named Summer, were raised on a farm that cultivated flowers and fruit, and served as a home to livestock and wild African animals. Throughout his youth, Galante spent time exploring the African bush, learning to wrangle snakes, trap small animals, and snorkel the reefs of the Bazaruto Archipelago. In Zimbabwe, he attended an English boarding school and headed up the Junior Herpetology Society, studying native flora and fauna.

In 2001, following the political uprising in Zimbabwe, which led to the invasion and burning of the family farm because Galante's family is white, Galante was forced to return to California. He resumed his education in Santa Barbara, where he graduated from high school and later earned a degree in biology from the University of California at Santa Barbara.

Galante's interest in wildlife and conservation continued into his adulthood. "After university, I set out to explore the world looking for the most beautiful, remote and wild places on the planet," he said. "I have been bitten by a venomous snake, in a plane crash, mauled by a lion, charged by a hippo, stung by a man-of-war jellyfish, bitten by a shark, in a car wreck, tumbled off a waterfall and stabbed by a stingray."

Career 
In 2013, Galante made his first foray into television with an appearance on the Discovery Channel's Naked and Afraid, where he participated in the show's 21-day survival challenge. He completed the challenge—being dropped with a stranger in the remote section of northwestern Panama—and scored one of the highest PSR (primitive survival rating) in the show's history.

In 2016, Galante and his photographer were among the first to ever swim with crocodiles, wearing special suits that mimic the crocodile's scaly skin and block the body's electrical current, allowing them to capture the reptile's natural behavior. The duo came within inches of the crocodiles, filming them in their authentic habitat for their film Dancing with Dragons.

On June 10, 2018, Galante's docu-series, Extinct or Alive premiered on Animal Planet. The show sought to reveal whether animals believed to be extinct can potentially still be found. In each episode, Galante explored the habitats of these animals, often seeking protection to help preserve the species and encourage their continued survival. Destinations have included Taiwan (to search for the Formosan clouded leopard), Newfoundland (to explore the White Wolf), and Madagascar (to search for traces of the giant Pachylemur). Galante has stated that he is committed to uncovering the Thylacine and, after two expeditions, will continue searching.

Galante produced the History channel show Face the Beast where two men attempt to retrace the steps of predators going on unexplained, killing rampages against humans. He has made media appearances on The Joe Rogan Experience, The Nightly Show, Shark Week, and The Today Show. He has also appeared in the GQ: The Breakdown video series.

In 2019, he appeared on 24 episodes of Nature's Strangest Mysteries: Solved, and testified in front of the United States Congress to promote legislature change and increase funding for conservation.

In 2020, Galante hosted a limited-edition television series named Wet Markets Exposed on Vice TV. Wet markets that sell live animals for human consumption, which can be sick, inbred, or endangered, can facilitate the transfer of diseases to humans. In the series, Galante discusses how the mistreatment and illegal selling and consumption of these animals allows the transfer of zoonotic viruses to humans.

In an interview in 2021, Galante was nicknamed "The Indiana Jones of Biology" by Psychic Garden.

His first book, Still Alive: A Wild Life of Rediscovery, was published in June 2021 by Hachette Books, and is described by the publisher as "part memoir, part biological adventure". In this book, Galante discusses his passion for bringing attention and research funding for preservation of the ecosystem.

In 2021, Forrest appeared in the sharkweek documentary called The Mystery of the Black Demon Shark.

In June 2021, Galante, the ICWCA (Ivan Carter Wildlife Conservation Alliance), and the Robert Nunley Family from Sabinal, TX, achieved the first-ever elephant translocation between two conservation areas within Mozambique, Africa. This was a multi-family group of 25 elephants that were moved from the edge of Maputo Special Reserve in South Eastern Mozambique to Zinave National Park in the Northern part of Mozambique.

In October 17, 2021, Forrest appeared in a documentary series on Animal Planet called Mysterious Creatures with Forrest Galante.

In July 2022, Galante lead an expedition to film epaulette sharks walking out of the water in various locations around Papua New Guinea. The footage was released during sharkweek on a documentary called Island of the Walking Sharks

Notable discoveries 
In his search for unique wildlife, Galante has visited over 60 countries.

During filming for the show in 2018, a camera trap caught apparent footage of a Zanzibar leopard on Unguja Island. The animal appeared smaller than specimens from the mainland, and seemed to have smaller, more solid spots than normally seen on African leopards. Further investigations are planned in order to confirm whether or not this is a Zanzibar leopard, and whether a viable population still exists.

During the shooting of a Shark Week special on the island of Sri Lanka, Galante's wife Jessica discovered a pair of deceased sharks that had previously been killed by fishermen. Although one of the sharks turned out to be a bull shark, DNA testing of the second specimen suggested that it could be a Pondicherry shark. It was stated that the species hadn't been seen since 1979, although other sources cite sightings in 2007, 2016, and 2018. While some regional experts were confident that the shark found in the episode was a Pondicherry shark, additional molecular confirmation is needed to confirm the shark's identity.

While shooting footage for Season 2 on the remote Galápagos Islands chain in February 2019, the team discovered a single female Fernandina Island Galápagos tortoise, presumed extinct since 1906. Members of the Turtle Conservancy later analyzed the findings, saying that pending genetic confirmation, the photos "almost undoubtedly" show the lost animal. The tortoise was described as being “in good health” but “underweight,” and was transported to the Fausto Llerena Tortoise Breeding Center in Isla Santa Cruz for the purpose of conservation and genetic tests. Trace evidence found on the expedition indicated that more individuals likely exist in the wild, and new searches were being planned to find a male Fernandina Tortoise that could potentially save the species. Washington Tapia-Aguilera, a biologist at the Galapagos Conservancy and director of the Giant Tortoise Restoration Initiative, disputes these events, saying he, not Galante, actually decided where to look for the tortoise and that "Ecuadorian park ranger Jeffreys Málaga was the one that knew the land, tracked the tortoise, and ultimately made the discovery before calling over the rest of the team."

While shooting footage for Season 2 on the island of Borneo in April and May 2019, the team caught five pieces of footage on a camera trap overlooking a mineral spring that clearly showed the Miller's grizzled langur, presumed extinct since 2011, at both day and night.

While shooting footage for Season 2 in Zimbabwe in 2019, the team collected DNA samples from an abnormally large lion that had recently been sighted in the area. Upon analyzing the DNA, the male was found to have 14% different DNA from a typical African lion, suggesting that it may have remnant genetics from the Cape lion population, which went extinct in the 1800s. The team theorizes that, through continued breeding, a pure Cape lion might one day be brought back.

In March 2019, while traveling in Son Doong cave in search for the Saola, Forrest discovered a new species of snail that is limegreen with a pink rim.

While shooting footage for Season 2 at Dong Mo Lake in Vietnam in 2019, the team, along with members of the Asian Turtle Program (ATP), captured footage of a Yangtze giant softshell turtle, a functionally extinct species with only three known surviving individuals, surfacing from the lake for a brief period. Although efforts to bring a surviving female of the species to the lake to possibly breed with the individual recorded in the episode failed due to her death in April 2019, the team hopes that their findings could contribute to a possible rescue of the species from extinction.

In 2019, Galante, along with primatologist Cortni Borgerson, excavated a non-fossilized, about 200-year-old skull and tusk of a hippopotamus in Madagascar. As the last confirmed occurrence of Malagasy hippopotamus dates back to about 1,000 years ago, Galante's discovery indicates the survival of hippos on Madagascar lasted much longer than previously thought.

While shooting footage for Season 2 in Colombia, the team caught and collected confirmed DNA samples from multiple individuals, including juveniles, of the Rio Apaporis caiman, a subspecies of spectacled caiman that had been believed to be extinct for over 30 years, suggesting that a healthy breeding population may exist in the area. A Colombian scientist named Sergio Balaguera-Reina had discovered the caiman prior to Galante's excursion and published a paper on it in 2019. Balaguera-Reina further disputes the claim that the caiman was believed to be extinct, saying, "We never thought that this caiman was extinct. But the political situation in Colombia prevented biologists from safely accessing the animal’s habitat to confirm that it’s still there."

During the shooting of a Shark Week special off the coast of South Africa, Galante was initially targeting two species and ended up finding three lost shark species. His first species was the whitetip weasel shark.  He captured footage on a camera trap that he suspected was the whitetip weasel shark.  He brought in an expert, Dr. Dave Ebert, who confirmed it was indeed the whitetail weasel shark.  His next target was the ornate sleeper-ray.  He initially used an underwater drone to look for the ray with no success. He got a lead on a new species thought lost forever from his expert, and he moved to a new location to target the flapnose houndshark, which hadn't been seen in 120 years.  While targeting this shark he got a call from a local divemaster who had footage he had captured on a recent night dive.  His footage showed footage of Austin's guitarfish, a recently described species by Dr. Ebert, and an ornate sleeper ray feeding.  Galante found a good habitat and attempted night fishing, and was able to catch and tag a flapnose houndshark.

Podcast 
Forrest Galante is the host of The Wild Times Podcast where he and two friends talk about wildlife, animals, adventure, and conservation. Although educational, it is not a typical educational podcast, as the hosts mix in comedy and games as they discuss various wildlife and adventure topics. Featuring guests from the wildlife community such as Coyote Peterson, Bradley Trevor Grieve, Rob "Caveman" Alleva and Adam Thorn from the Kings of Pain television series, the Wild Times Podcast  was started in March 2020. The podcast is still airing new episodes as of 2023, and boasts a catalog of over 100 episodes, as well as dozens more uncensored episodes on their Patreon website called, "The Wild Times Underground."

Criticism
As host of the Extinct or Alive series, Galante has been seen negatively by ecologists for being a "parachute scientist". Galante's website stated that he personally captured the first video footage of a Zanzibar servaline genet, which is contradicted by Zanzibar researchers. Galante has also claimed that he personally rediscovered the Fernandina Island tortoise  and the Rio Apaporis Caiman, both claims which have been contradicted by the leaders of their respective expeditions, the latter of which published their findings and exploration prior to Galante's trip to Colombia. As of 2022, Galante has not outlined his claimed discoveries in any scientific journals. Washington Tapia-Aguilera, a biologist at the Galapagos Conservancy and director of the Giant Tortoise Restoration Initiative, also disputes Galante's claims, saying he, not Galante, actually decided where to look for the tortoise and that "Ecuadorian park ranger Jeffreys Málaga was the one that knew the land, tracked the tortoise, and ultimately made the discovery before calling over the rest of the team."

References

External links 

Forrest Galante on IMDb
Forrest Galante Finds Long-Forgotten Animal Species on Extinct or Alive - Collider MasterWork via YouTube

1988 births
Living people
People from California
Participants in American reality television series
Survivalists
University of California, Santa Barbara alumni